National Guard Armory is a historic National Guard armory located at Fort Mill, York County, South Carolina.

History
The armory was built in 1938 with funds provided by the Works Progress Administration. The brick building consists of a central block with tall vertical windows, two flanking sections, and two end sections. The brickwork and windows are reflective of Art Deco style architecture.

It was added to the National Register of Historic Places in 1992.

References

Armories on the National Register of Historic Places in South Carolina
Buildings and structures in York County, South Carolina
Buildings and structures completed in 1938
Military installations established in 1938
National Register of Historic Places in York County, South Carolina
Art Deco architecture in South Carolina
Works Progress Administration in South Carolina